The Office of Critical Infrastructure Protection and Emergency Preparedness (OCIPEP) is a Canadian government bureau that was created during Anne McLellan's tenure at the Department of Public Safety and Emergency Preparedness (PSEP).

In line with the April 2004 Martin government policy document entitled Securing an Open Society: Canada's National Security Policy, the OCIPEP was removed from the ambit of the Department of National Defence into the PSP.

History
Canada's civil defence measures evolved over time. As with many other matters in Canada, responsibility is shared between the federal and provincial government. The first post-WWII civil defence co-ordinator was appointed in October 1948 "to supervise the work of federal, provincial and municipal authorities in planning for public air-raid shelters, emergency food and medical supplies, and the evacuation of likely target areas".

In 1959, the Government of Canada, under John Diefenbaker handed authority for civilian defense to the Emergency Measures Organisation (EMO). Large fallout shelters, known as "Diefenbunkers" were built at rural locations outside major cities across Canada at the height of the Cold War during the infancy of the ICBM threat.

The EMO then became Emergency Planning Canada in 1974, then Emergency Preparedness Canada in 1986. In February 2001, the Government replaced Emergency Preparedness with the  Office of Critical Infrastructure Protection and Emergency Preparedness (OCIPEP), responsible for civilian emergency planning in both peace and war.

References

Public Safety Canada
Emergency management in Canada